Nature Microbiology  is a monthly online-only peer reviewed scientific journal published by Nature Portfolio. It was established in 2016. The editor-in-chief is Susan Jones who is part of an in-house team of editors.

Abstracting and indexing
The journal is abstracted and indexed in:

PubMed
Science Citation Index Expanded
Scopus

According to the Journal Citation Reports, the journal has a 2021 impact factor of 30.964, ranking it 5th out of 136 journals in the category "Microbiology".

References

External links
Official website

Nature Research academic journals
Microbiology journals
English-language journals
Publications established in 2016
Monthly journals
Online-only journals